Under the Whyte notation for the classification of steam locomotives, 2-2-4-0T represents the wheel arrangement of two leading wheels on one axle, two driving wheels powered from the inside cylinders, four coupled driving wheels powered from the outside cylinders but no trailing wheels.

Usage
This unusual wheel arrangement appears only ever to have been used on one divided drive compound tank locomotive designed  by Francis Webb of the London and North Western Railway, No. 777 in 1887. The type does not appear to have been successful since only one was ever built and this was withdrawn in 1901.

References

Whyte notation
London and North Western Railway locomotives